= George Hartness =

English association football player

Personal information
- Full name: George Hartness
- Date of birth: 18 December 1872
- Place of birth: Sunderland, England
- Date of death: 1943 (aged 70–71)
- Position: Inside forward

Senior career*
Years	Team	Apps	(Gls)
1895	Monkwearmouth		
1895–1897	Sunderland	2	(0)
- * Club domestic league appearances and goals

George Hartness (18 December 1872 – 1943) was an English professional footballer who played as an inside forward for Sunderland.
